Aramos is a genus of moths in the family Cossidae.

Species
Aramos ramosa (Schaus, 1892)
Aramos itys (Druce, 1911)

Former species
Aramos masoni (Schaus, 1894)

References

Natural History Museum Lepidoptera generic names catalog

Zeuzerinae
Cossidae genera